The Church of San Pedro Apóstol (Spanish: Iglesia de San Pedro Apóstol) is a church located in Ribatejada, Spain. It was declared Bien de Interés Cultural in 1996.

It was built in the 15th century, in Mudéjar style.

References 

15th-century Roman Catholic church buildings in Spain
Pedro Apostol, Ribatejada
Mudéjar architecture in the Community of Madrid
Bien de Interés Cultural landmarks in the Community of Madrid